Pandulf of Capua may refer to:
Pandulf Ironhead (d. 981), Pandulf I of Capua
Pandulf II of Benevento (d. 1014), Pandulf III of Capua
Pandulf II of Capua (d. aft. 1016)
Pandulf IV of Capua (d. 1049/50)
Pandulf V of Capua (d. aft. 1027)
Pandulf VI of Capua (d. 1057)